Yusefabad (also Romanized as Yūsefābād and Yūsofābād) is a village in Koshkuiyeh Rural District, Koshkuiyeh District, Rafsanjan County, Kerman Province, Iran. At the 2006 census, its population was 443, in 99 families.

References 

Populated places in Rafsanjan County